{{Infobox newspaper
|name=
|image=
|caption=That's Beijings 5th-year anniversary cover
|type=
|format=
|foundation=2001 
|publisher=China Intercontinental Press
|language=English
|headquarters=Beijing, People's Republic of China
|ISSN=1672-8025
|website=thatsmags.com/beijing
}}That's Beijing''' is a monthly English language magazine, distributed throughout Beijing, with a focus on news, current events, culture, art, music, fashion, nightlife and dining in Beijing. It is owned by Shanghai-based publishing group, Urbanatomy Media, who also own, That's Shanghai and that's PRD'' (covering the Pearl River Delta). The China "That's" brand was started by Mark Kitto in 1998.

References

External links 
 that's Guangzhou
 that's Shanghai
 that's Beijing

2001 establishments in China
Magazines published in China
Monthly magazines published in China
City guides
English-language magazines
Free magazines
Local interest magazines
Magazines established in 2001
Magazines published in Beijing